The 2017 FIBA Oceania Under-17 Women's Championship was an international under-17 basketball tournament held from 10–15 July 2017 by FIBA Oceania in Hagåtña, Guam. Australia defeated New Zealand in the Finals, 81–60. Both teams will now move on to the 2018 FIBA Under-18 Women's Asian Championship, which in turn the qualifying tournament for the 2019 FIBA Under-19 Women's Basketball World Cup.

Hosts Selection
On 23 September 2016, FIBA Oceania announced during their Board Meeting that Guam was to host the tournament. The Calvo Field House of the University of Guam in Hagåtña was the main venue for the championship.

Participating teams
On 13 April 2017, the following teams confirmed their participation to the main tournament:

Draw
On 12 May 2017, the draw for the main tournament was held in Hagåtña, Guam.

Group Phase
All times are in Chamorro Time Zone (UTC+10:00)

Group A

Group B

Final phase

Division A

Semifinals

Bronze medal game

Gold medal game

Division B

Bronze medal game

Gold medal game

Final standings

Division A

Division B

Awards 
The All-Star Five were announced on 15 July 2017.

References

External links 
 FIBA Oceania U-16 Championship for Women

2017–18 in Oceanian basketball
2017 in Guamanian sports
International women's basketball competitions hosted by the United States
2017
Basketball in Guam
July 2017 sports events in Oceania
International sports competitions hosted by Guam